Erythrina perrieri is a species of legume in the family Fabaceae. It is found only in Madagascar.

References

Sources
 

perrieri
Endemic flora of Madagascar
Critically endangered plants
Taxonomy articles created by Polbot